Uintah County is a county in the U.S. state of Utah. As of the 2020 United States Census the population was 35,620. Its county seat and largest city is Vernal. The county was named for the portion of the Ute Indian tribe that lived in the basin.

Uintah County is the largest natural gas producer in Utah, with 272 billion cubic feet produced in 2008.

The Vernal, UT Micropolitan Statistical Area includes all of Uintah County.

History
Archeological evidence suggests that portions of the Uinta Basin have been inhabited by Archaic peoples and Fremont peoples. By the time of recorded history, its inhabitants were the Ute people. The first known traverse by non-Indians was made by Fathers Domínguez and Escalante (1776), as they sought to establish a land route between California and Spanish America.

The region was claimed by the Spanish Empire as the Alta California division  of New Spain (1521-1821) and was later under Mexican control (1821-1848).

By the early nineteenth century, occasional fur trappers entered the Basin. In 1831-32 Antoine Robidoux, a French trapper licensed by the Mexican government established a trading post near present-day Whiterocks. He abandoned the effort in 1844.

In 1847 a contingent of Mormons under Brigham Young entered the Great Salt Lake Valley to the west of the Uintah region to establish what would become Salt Lake City. In 1861 Young dispatched an exploring party to the Uinta Basin; they reported "that section of country lying between the Wasatch Mountains and the eastern boundary of the territory, and south of Green River country, was one vast contiguity of waste and measurably valueless." Young made no further effort to establish communities in the area but nonetheless included it in their proposed State of Deseret.

The United States took possession under the 1848 Treaty of Guadalupe Hidalgo. In 1861 US President Abraham Lincoln created the Uintah and Ouray Indian Reservation, reserved for the use and habitation of Utah and Colorado Indians. In the 1880s, the Uncompahgre Reservation was created in the southern portion of present-day Uintah County. Ashley Valley was not part of either Reservation; by 1880, enough ranchers and farmers had settled there that the Territorial Legislature created Uintah County from portions of Sanpete, Summit, and Wasatch counties. They established the county seat at Ashley, a now-abandoned settlement three miles north of the present courthouse in Vernal.

Uintah County boundaries were altered in 1892 (Grand County created), in 1917 (adjustments with Duchesne and Summit county boundaries), in 1918 (Daggett County created), and in 1919 (the Daggett boundary line was adjusted). It has remained in its present configuration since 1919.

Gilsonite was discovered in 1888 at Bonanza, in central Uintah County. This was on Reservation land, but miners pressured the US government to remove some 7000 acres (11 square miles; 28 km2) for mining use. Mining and its associated activities (including relative lawlessness) rapidly boomed in that area.

The northern boundary of Uintah County originally extended to the north border of Utah. In 1918, the extreme northern portion (lying north of the Uinta Mountain watershed divide) was split off to form Daggett County.

Geography
Uintah County lies on the east side of Utah. Its eastern border abuts the western border of the state of Colorado. The Green River flows southwestward through the central part of the county and forms the lower part of Uintah County's border with Duchesne County. Two miles south of Ouray, Utah, it is joined by the Duchesne River (flowing east-southeastward from Duchesne County), and three miles (5 km) farther down by the White River (flowing west-northwestward from Colorado). Ten miles farther downstream, it is joined by Willow Creek, flowing northward from the lower part of the county. The county terrain slopes to the south and to the west, with its highest parts found on the crests of the Uinta Mountains, running east-west across the northern border. The maximum elevation along those crests is around 12,276' (3742m).

Uintah County is centered in the Uintah Basin, which runs from western Colorado on the east to the Wasatch Mountains on the west and from the Uinta Mountains on the north to the Roan Plateau on the south. This basin was formed by a prehistoric lake ("Uinta Lake") during the late Tertiary period.

The county's geography ranges from high mountain terrain (Uinta Mountains) to the fertile Ashley Valley (site of the county seat), to a rugged and desolate canyonland which includes the Dinosaur National Monument, to desolate and largely uninhabited hills in the south ("The Bookcliffs" to locals; officially Roan Plateau).

Mines
 Dyer Mine, (copper, gold, silver), elevation:  MSL
 Little Water Mine, (coal), elevation:  MSL
 Uteland Mine, (coal) , elevation  MSL

Major highways

 U.S. Route 40
 US Route 191
 Utah State Route 45
 Utah State Route 88
 Utah State Route 121

Adjacent counties

 Daggett County - north
 Moffat County, Colorado - northeast
 Rio Blanco County, Colorado - east
 Garfield County, Colorado - southeast
 Grand County - south
 Emery County - southwest
 Carbon County - west
 Duchesne County - west

Protected areas

 Ashley National Forest (part)
 Dinosaur National Monument (part)
 Horseshoe Bend State Park
 Musket Shot Springs Scenic Overlook
 Ouray National Wildlife Refuge
 Point of Pines Recreation Site (part)
 Pot Creek Recreation Site
 Red Fleet State Park
 Sears Canyon Wildlife Management Area
Steinaker State Park
 Stewart Lake Waterfowl Management Area

Lakes

 Alma Taylor Lake
 Ashley Twin Lakes
 Association Reservoir
 Big Lake
 Billeys Reservoir
 Blue Lake
 Bottle Hollow Reservoir
 Box Reservoir
 Brough Reservoir
 Bullock Draw Reservoir
 Bullwinkle Reservoir
 Burns Bench Reservoir
 Burton Reservoir
 Butte Reservoir
 Cement Reservoir
 Chimney Rock Lake
 Chokecherry Flat Reservoir
 Counting Station Reservoir
 Cow Wash Reservoir
 Crouse Reservoir
 Dead Lake
 Deadman Lake
 Dollar Lake
 East Park Reservoir
 Fish Lake
 Flu Knoll Reservoir
 Goose Lakes
 Lower Goose Lake
 Upper Goose Lake
 Gull Lake
 Hacking Lake
 Hacking Reservoir
 Hatch Reservoir
 Herman-Sadlier Reservoir
 Hopper Lakes
 Johnson Lake
 Julius Park Reservoir
 Kibah Lakes
 Kilroy Reservoir
 Lake Wilde
 Lily Lake
 Lily Pad Lake
 Little Elk Lake
 Little Lake
 Long Park Reservoir
 Lower Grouse Reservoir
 Lynn Haslem Reservoir
 McCoy Reservoir Number 1
 McCoy Reservoir Number 2
 Matt Warner Reservoir
 Merkley Reservoir
 Mill Pond
 Moap Lake
 Montes Creek Reservoir
 Mytoge Lake
 Oaks Park Reservoir
 Paradise Park Reservoir
 Pariette East Dike Reservoir
 Pariette Flood Control Reservoir
 Paul Lake
 Pearl Lake
 Pelican Lake
 Red Belly Lake
 Red Fleet Reservoir
 Sand Lake
 Saucer Lake
 Shiner Reservoir
 Siddoways Reservoir
 Stauffer Chemical Tailings Pond North
 Steinaker Reservoir
 Stewart Lake
 Sunday School Reservoir
 Teds Lake
 Towave Reservoir
 Twin Lakes
 Warren Draw
 Watkins Lake (part)
 Whiterocks Lake
 Wooley Lakes
 Wooley Reservoir
 Workman Lake (part)
 Zelph Calder Reservoir

Demographics

2020 census
As of the 2020 United States Census, there were 35,620 people and 10,739 households in the county. The population density was 7.9/sqmi (2.17/km2). There were 13,736 housing units at an average density of 3.06/sqmi (0.78/km2). The racial makeup of the county was 87.9% White, 0.7% Black or African American, 7.9% Native American, 0.7% Asian, 0.4% Pacific Islander, and 2.05% from two or more races. 8.7% of the population was Hispanic or Latino of any race.

There were 10,739 households of which 37.29% had children under 18 living with them, 70.3% were families (7,550), 58.07% were married couples living together, 9.38% had a female householder with no husband presents. 17.20% of all households were made up of individuals, and 31.8% had someone living alone who was 60 years of age or older. The average household size was 3.29, and the average family size was 4.08.

The county population contained 31.8% under the age of 18, 10.70% from 18 to 24, 25.40% from 25 to 44, 19.30% from 45 to 64, and 12.00% who were 65 years of age or older. The median age was 29 years. For every 100 females, there were 101 males. For every 100 females aged 18 and over, there were 95.90 males.

The median income for a household in the county was $34,518, and the median income for a family was $59,428. Males had a median income of $33,966 versus $21,199 for females. The per capita income for the county was $13,571. About 12% of families and 15% of the population were below the poverty line, including 18% of those under age 18 and 10% of those age 65 or over.

Economy
The extraction of natural resources, including oil, natural gas, phosphate, and gilsonite constitute primary economic activity of Uintah County. There is some agriculture in Uintah County, primarily focusing on raising cattle and sheep and cultivating alfalfa.

A significant portion of west Uintah County is taken up by the Uintah and Ouray Indian Reservation. The Ute Tribe's headquarters is in Fort Duchesne. Much of the rest of the county is land owned by the Ashley National Forest and the Bureau of Land Management. There is relatively little private land in the county.

The Discovery of significant dinosaurs and other pre-historic remains on the eastern edge of the county caused nationwide interest, which culminated in the establishment of Dinosaur National Monument. In addition to the large Visitor Center at the Monument's Jensen site, a natural history museum, the Utah Field House of Natural History State Park Museum, showcasing some of the area's finds, was established in Vernal by the State of Utah.

Transportation

Airport
Located in southeastern Vernal, the Vernal Regional Airport provides daily scheduled air service to Denver, Colorado via Denver International Airport. Service is provided through United Express, operated by Skywest airlines. Fixed-Base Operator (FBO) service is available.

Attractions

Special events
The Games, Animations, and More Convention (GAM) (formerly Games, Anime, and More (G.A.M.)), a biannual fan convention, is a multi-genre convention having retro video games (such as those for classic Nintendo and SEGA video game consoles), semi-contemporary video games (such as those for the Xbox 360 video game console), card games, cartoons, superhero costumes, miniatures, tournaments, tabletop gaming, and other gaming and "nerd culture" activities.

The GAM Convention is typically held once or more per year in Uintah County. In 2015 it was the first anime convention held in Vernal as well as the first video gaming convention held there, making it the first convention of its type in Vernal. In 2016 it was held in Naples for the first time, making GAM the first convention of its type in the city of Naples. It has previously been sponsored by Showalter Ford, a local vehicle dealership.

Politics and Government 
Since 1896 when Utah was admitted to The Union, Uintah County has voted for the Democratic presidential nominee eight times: twice from 1896 to 1900, once in 1916, and five times from 1932 to 1948.  Only once has the majority voted for a "third party" candidate, that being Theodore Roosevelt in 1912. Since 1948, like most of Utah, Uintah County has trended powerfully Republican.

Communities

Cities
 Ballard
 Naples
 Vernal (county seat)

Census-designated places

 Bonanza
 Fort Duchesne
 Jensen
 Lapoint
 Maeser
 Randlett
 Whiterocks

Unincorporated communities

 Avalon
 Bennett
 Dry Fork
 Gusher
 Hayden
 Leeton
 Leota
 Ouray
 Red Wash
 Tridell

See also
 Fantasy Canyon
 National Register of Historic Places listings in Uintah County, Utah
 Uintah and Ouray Indian Reservation

References

External links

 
 Dinosaur National Monument website
  Ashley National Forest website

 
1880 establishments in Utah Territory
Populated places established in 1880